Brandon Aiyuk (born March 17, 1998) is an American football wide receiver for the San Francisco 49ers of the National Football League (NFL). He played college football at Sierra College and Arizona State and was drafted by the 49ers in the first round of the 2020 NFL Draft.

Early life and high school
Aiyuk was born in Rocklin, California and grew up in Reno, Nevada. He attended Robert McQueen High School. He played wide receiver, defensive back and returned kicks for the McQueen high school football team and was named first-team All-Northern Nevada and honorable mention All-State as a senior.

College career

Aiyuk began his collegiate football career at Sierra College. As a freshman, he caught 29 passes for 573 yards and five touchdowns and was named All-Big 8 Conference. He was named a Junior College All-American in his sophomore season after recording 60 receptions for 960 yards and 14 touchdowns while also returning 11 kickoffs for 418 yards and two touchdowns and 14 punts for 313 yards and a touchdown. He finished his junior college career with 2,499 all-purpose yards and 21 touchdowns. Aiyuk committed to transfer to Arizona State for the final two years of his NCAA eligibility over offers from Colorado State, Kansas, Tennessee, and Alabama. He chose Arizona State because it was one of the few schools that recruited him to play wide receiver, instead as only a return specialist or planned to move him to the defensive side of the ball.

In his first year with the Sun Devils, Aiyuk had 33 catches for 474 yards and three touchdowns with an additional 381 total return yards. Aiyuk was named third-team preseason All-Pac-12 Conference going into his senior season. He was named the Pac-12 Offensive Player of the Week after catching seven passes for 196 yards and three touchdowns in a 38–34 win over Washington State on October 12, 2019. Aiyuk was also named the conference Special Teams Player of the Week after posting 44 kickoff return yards and 76 punt return yards, 63 of which came on his first return for a touchdown at ASU, against Oregon State on November 16. He also had a career high 10 receptions for 173 receiving yards and a touchdown in the game and his 293 all-purpose yards were the fifth-most in a single game in school history. Aiyuk finished the season with 65 receptions for 1,192 yards and eight touchdowns, returned 14 punts for 226 yards and one touchdown and 14 kickoffs for 446 yards, and was named first-team All-Pac-12 as both a wide receiver and as a return specialist.

College statistics

Professional career

Aiyuk was selected by the San Francisco 49ers in the first round with the 25th pick in the 2020 NFL Draft after they acquired the pick from the Minnesota Vikings in a trade. On June 26, 2020, Aiyuk signed a four-year $12.5 million contract with the team, with a $6.6 million signing bonus. On August 23, 2020, Aiyuk sustained a hamstring injury in training camp, resulting in him being inactive in Week 1. He made his NFL debut in Week 2 against the New York Jets and recorded two receptions for 21 yards in the 31–13 victory. In Week 3 against the New York Giants, Aiyuk recorded 101 yards from scrimmage and his first career rushing touchdown during the 36–9 win. He became the franchise's first wide receiver since 1970 to have a rushing touchdown be their first career score. In Week 4, against the Philadelphia Eagles on NBC Sunday Night Football, he had a 38-yard rushing touchdown in the 25–20 loss. He became the first wide receiver since the NFL-AFL merger to record two rushing touchdowns in his first three professional games. He recorded his first professional 100-yard game with six receptions for 115 yards in a 33–6 victory over the New England Patriots in Week 7.

Aiyuk was placed on the reserve/COVID-19 list by the team on November 4, 2020, and activated two days later. He was placed back on the COVID-19 list on November 20, and activated again on December 2. In Week 14 against the Washington Football Team, Aiyuk recorded 10 catches for 119 yards during the 23–15 loss. The following week in a road game against the Dallas Cowboys, Aiyuk hauled in 9 catches for 73 yards and a touchdown in the 41–33 loss.

NFL career statistics

References

External links
San Francisco 49ers bio
Arizona State Sun Devils bio

1998 births
Living people
Arizona State Sun Devils football players
Players of American football from Nevada
American football wide receivers
Sierra Wolverines football players
Sportspeople from Reno, Nevada
San Francisco 49ers players
African-American players of American football
21st-century African-American sportspeople